Tier 3 may refer to:

 Tier 3 (nightclub), in New York, U.S.
 Tier 3 of the First COVID-19 tier regulations in England, the highest level
 Tier 3 of the Second COVID-19 tier regulations in England
 Tier 3 Railway lines in Australia
 Tier III, a data center standard
 Tier 3 in United States vehicle emission standards

See also
 Multitier architecture
 WTA Tier III tournaments, Women's Tennis Association tennis third-level tournaments
 Three-tier system (disambiguation)
 Tier III- (Tier 3 minus), an unmanned aerial vehicle
 Tier 1 (disambiguation)
 Tier 2 (disambiguation)
 Tier 4 (disambiguation)